Peptidyl-prolyl cis-trans isomerase-like 1 is an enzyme that in humans is encoded by the PPIL1 gene.

This gene is a member of the cyclophilin family of peptidylprolyl isomerases (PPIases). The cyclophilins are a highly conserved, ubiquitous family, members of which play an important role in protein folding, immunosuppression by cyclosporin A, and infection of HIV-1 virions. 

Based on similarity to other PPIases, this protein could accelerate the folding of proteins and might catalyze the cis-trans isomerization of proline imidic peptide bonds in oligopeptides.

References

Further reading